The Agram 2000 is a Croatian submachine gun based on Beretta's model M12. ("Agram" is the old German name for Zagreb, the capital of Croatia.) The vast numbers of ex-special forces Agrams in Croatia after the Croatian War of Independence, as well as the availability of a sound suppressor, has made it a popular choice for criminals. Infamously unreliable in the war period due to its poorly constructed magazines, it would often fail to feed rounds from the magazine, decreasing its commercial demand outside of Croatia and transnational criminal organizations of the time.

The Agram 2000, like the Beretta M12, was chambered for the 9×19mm Parabellum cartridge. These weapons were used in the Kosovo War by both sides of the conflict, and were preferred due to its full-auto fire, provisions for silencer, flexible ammunition count and compact size. Today, the 2000 series is a rarity outside the Balkan areas, because even though it is still produced in Croatia, its production has been scaled down. Mainly produced between 1990 and 1993, only a few more examples have been produced since 1997. The reason for this is that the Agram 2000 is locally manufactured and there is no more conflict or demand for a fully automatic SMG in the region anymore, and low demand due to poor and cheap construction.

Specifications
The unique feature on this gun is the thumb-hole foregrip that ensures a firm grip and good recoil control while firing fully auto. The charging handle is on the left-hand side of the receiver, just above the magazine. The fire selector is found just above the trigger which allows for safety, single-shot, and full-auto firing modes (S/1/A). The barrel shroud is perforated for heat dispersion and sports a front iron sight post. Some sources report that it has a rate of fire of 800 rounds per minute. The barrel is slightly longer and is threaded to enable the attachment of a silencer or muzzle brake. The materials used for making this weapon include stamped, sheet metal and molded plastic. The specifications for the buttstock do not exist. The Agram 2000 measures at about  without the sound suppressor on.

References

Sources
 
 Small Arms Military Factory

9mm Parabellum submachine guns
Submachine guns of Croatia